This is a list of hurlers who have received a winners' medal in the All-Ireland Senior Hurling Championship.

Currently, the Gaelic Athletic Association issues 26 medals to the winning team; however, the individual county board have the option of ordering extra medals for members of the extended panel or for players who may have played during the championship but missed the final due to injury.

The winning captain is also presented with a miniature version of the Liam MacCarthy Cup.

Winning Players

References

Winners
Winners
All-Ireland Senior Hurling Championship winners